Stanhopea pulla is a type of orchid occurring from Costa Rica to northern Colombia.

References

External links 

pulla
Orchids of Colombia
Orchids of Costa Rica